Suytino is a rural locality (a village) in Gorod Vyazniki, Vyaznikovsky District, Vladimir Oblast, Russia. The population was 1 as of 2010.

Geography 
Suytino is located 10 km southeast of Vyazniki (the district's administrative centre) by road. Selishche is the nearest rural locality.

References 

Rural localities in Vyaznikovsky District